Pieter Rossouw may refer to:

 Pieter Rossouw (cricketer) (born 1980), Namibian cricketer
 Pieter Rossouw (rugby union) (born 1971), South African rugby player and coach